Nurlan Mendygaliev (born 5 April 1961) is a Kazakhstani former water polo player who competed in the 1988 Summer Olympics.

See also
 List of Olympic medalists in water polo (men)
 List of world champions in men's water polo
 List of World Aquatics Championships medalists in water polo

References

External links
 

1961 births
Living people
Kazakhstani male water polo players
Olympic water polo players of the Soviet Union
Water polo players at the 1988 Summer Olympics
Olympic bronze medalists for the Soviet Union
Olympic medalists in water polo
Asian Games medalists in water polo
Water polo players at the 1994 Asian Games
Medalists at the 1988 Summer Olympics
Asian Games gold medalists for Kazakhstan
Medalists at the 1994 Asian Games